"I'd Rather Ride Around with You" is a song written by Tim Nichols and Mark D. Sanders, and recorded by American country music artist Reba McEntire. It was released on March 4, 1997 as the third single from her album What If It's You. The song reached #2 on the Billboard Hot Country Singles & Tracks chart in July 1997, behind "Carrying Your Love with Me" by George Strait.

Music video
The music video premiered on CMT on March 6, 1997, during The CMT Delivery Room, and was directed by Gerry Wenner.

Chart performance

Year-end charts

References

1997 singles
1996 songs
Reba McEntire songs
Songs written by Mark D. Sanders
Songs written by Tim Nichols
MCA Records singles